Ardisia schlechteri is a species of plant in the family Primulaceae. It is endemic to Cameroon.  Its natural habitat is subtropical or tropical dry forests. It is threatened by habitat loss.

References

Flora of Cameroon
schlechteri
Critically endangered plants
Taxonomy articles created by Polbot